Blackrock Further Education Institute (BFEI; formerly Senior College Dún Laoghaire) is a college of further education in Dublin which was established in 1982. In 2014 it moved to Blackrock in a redeveloped Town Hall, Technical College and Carnegie Library. It provides both higher educational qualifications (BTEC Higher National Diploma) as well as technical/vocational education and training in areas including Beauty Therapy, Creative Multimedia, Marketing, Auctioneering and Estate Agency Practice, Accountancy and Design. Blackrock Further Education Institute is located in  Blackrock,  from Dublin City Centre.

Since its foundation the Institute developed rapidly and was soon providing Accounting, Marketing and Auctioneering, Business, Beautician, Health and Wellbeing Therapies, Creative Multimedia, Computing and Communications Technology and Interior Design courses for full-time and part-time students. The Institute is now one of the largest educational providers in the Further Education sector with over 1,000 students and offers full-time, mornings only as well as night courses. The Institute provides awards at QQI Levels 5 and 6 as well as the more advanced BTEC/Edexcel Higher National Diploma. Many students who successfully complete the Higher National Diploma in Business progress on to the third (and final) year of a related degree in Swansea Metropolitan University or IADT Dun Laoghaire.

The new campus at Blackrock involved the restoration and refurbishment of three protected buildings, Blackrock Town Hall, the Carnegie Library and the Blackrock Technical School. While maintaining the facade, the interior was restructured and a new L-shaped building, was added, incorporating a structural steel frame with block-work infill. In 2015 the building was nominated at the Irish Building and Design Awards in the category Building Project of the Year, and it was shortlisted for an award from the Royal Institute of the Architects of Ireland in the same year.

References

External links
 BFEI website
 Dublin and  Dún Laoghaire ETB website (DDLETB)
 Accounting Technicians Ireland (ATI)
 Qualifications and Quality Ireland (QQI)
 Edexcel
 Institute of Commercial Management (ICM)
 ITEC Beauty Qualifications
 CISCO Certified Network Associate

Business schools in the Republic of Ireland
Educational institutions established in 1982
Further education colleges in Dún Laoghaire–Rathdown
1982 establishments in Ireland